Lovecraft is a crater on Mercury, located near the south pole.  Its name was adopted by the International Astronomical Union (IAU) in 2013, after American author Howard Phillips Lovecraft.

Lovecraft lies on the northeast rim of Roerich crater.

Lovecraft has a crater floor that is in permanent shadow.  So do nearby craters Chao Meng-Fu (at the south pole), Hurley, and L'Engle.

See also
Cthulhu Macula – a feature on Pluto named after part of Lovecraft's work

References

H. P. Lovecraft
Impact craters on Mercury